Robin M. Canup (born November 20, 1968) is an American astrophysicist. Her main area of research concerns the origins of planets and satellites. In 2003, Canup was awarded the Harold C. Urey Prize. In April, 2022, Canup presented the findings of the Planetary Science Decadal Survey as co-chair of the Survey Steering Committee with Philip R. Christensen.

Biography
She received her B.S. from Duke University and her PhD from the University of Colorado at Boulder. 

Canup is known for her research based upon the giant impact hypothesis, using intensive modeling to simulate how planetary collisions unfold. In 2012, Canup first published a refinement to the giant impact hypothesis, arguing that the Moon and the Earth formed in a series of steps that started with a massive collision of two planetary bodies, each larger than Mars, which then re-collided to form what we now call Earth. After the re-collision, Earth was surrounded by a disk of material, which combined to form the Moon. She has written a book on the origin of the Earth and Moon. Canup has also published research describing a giant impact origin for Pluto and Charon.

Canup is an accomplished ballet dancer and danced the lead role in Coppélia in the Boulder Ballet one week after finishing her dissertation.

Selected works

 (member of Space Studies board)

References

External links
 from National Academy of Sciences
Interview with Robin Canup for NOVA series: To the Moon WGBH Educational Foundation, raw footage, 1998
“NOVA; To the Moon; Interview with Robin M. Canup, Astrophysicist,” 1998-00-00, WGBH, American Archive of Public Broadcasting (GBH and the Library of Congress), Boston, MA and Washington, DC.

Living people
1968 births
Duke University alumni
University of Colorado alumni
American women astronomers
Place of birth missing (living people)
Members of the United States National Academy of Sciences
Planetary scientists
Women planetary scientists